Language history is;

Historical linguistics
History of a language
Internal history
External history
Evolution of languages

Historical linguistics